Santa María la Real is a Gothic-style, Roman Catholic church, located on Plaza Plaza Teobaldos 1 in Olite, region of Navarre, Spain.

History
The church was erected during the 13th through 14th-centuries. It stands adjacent to the Palacio Real de Olite, much favored by King Charles III of Navarre (1361-1425).

The interior has a retablo depicting the Virgin Mary and the Christ of la Buena Muerte. The 14th-century Christ statue may derive from the former church of San Lázaro.

The facade is profusely decorated with sculptures. The portal, below a large rose window, is formed by 8 arches. In the tympanum are various stories of the early Life of Christ and the Virgin.

References

External links

Bien de Interés Cultural landmarks in Navarre
Roman Catholic churches in Navarre
Buildings and structures in Olite
Gothic architecture in Navarre
13th-century Roman Catholic church buildings in Spain